This list of tallest buildings in Saudi Arabia ranks the tallest buildings in Saudi Arabia by height. The tallest building in Mecca is the 601 meter super-tall skyscraper Abraj Al-Bait Royal Clock Tower. It is the world's fourth tallest building and houses the Fairmont Makkah Clock Royal Tower Hotel. The high rise construction boom has extended the skyline of in the past two decades, with the PIF Tower, completed in 2021, becoming Riyadh's tallest building at 385 meters. Riyadh is now the 3rd city in the Middle East after Dubai and Abu Dhabi. A total of 100 skyscrapers have been constructed since 2014 in the city.

Tallest buildings 
An equal sign (=) following a rank indicates the same height between two or more buildings. For other structures, see List of tallest structures in Saudi Arabia.

Tallest buildings under construction

Tallest buildings approved

Tallest buildings proposed

Horizontal skyscraper
Saudi Arabia crown prince Mohammed bin Salman announced that the state will be building a long horizontal skyscraper. Being officially presented under the name of The Line, the complex will be a linear smart city placed in Neom, Tabuk Province, which is designed to have no cars, streets or carbon emissions.

See also 
 List of tallest buildings in the world
 List of tallest structures in the Middle East
 List of tallest buildings in Asia
 List of tallest structures in the world by country
 List of buildings taller than 400 metres
 List of tallest buildings and structures in the world
 List of tallest hotels in the world
 List of tallest residential buildings in the world

References

External links 
 Council on Tall Buildings and Urban Habitat Documents most planned, built and under-construction skyscrapers
 Emporis, International database of various buildings
 Urbika, Includes many projects not documented by other websites
 SkyscraperPage, Database and diagrams of most skyscrapers

Saudi Arabia

Saudi Arabia
Tallest